Lucas James DeKoster (June 18, 1918 – February 23, 2000) was an American politician who served in the Iowa Senate from 1965 to 1983.

He was born to parents John and Sarah Katherine DeKoster in Hull, Iowa, on June 18, 1918. After graduating from Hull High School in his hometown, DeKoster successively attended Kansas State College and Iowa State College, completing a bachelor's degree in mechanical engineering in 1939. He was a designer of jet-propulsion engines for the aeronautical industry and worked in New Jersey, Virginia and Ohio. While an Ohio resident, DeKoster studied at the Cleveland–Marshall College of Law. Upon passing the Iowa bar exam in June 1952, DeKoster returned to Hull and practiced general and patent law.

DeKoster won election to the Iowa Senate for the first time in 1964, as a Republican legislator representing District 50. He subsequently served a four-year term for District 49 starting in 1967, and thereafter held the District 1 seat until stepping down in 1983. In 1970, he was a Republican candidate for floor leader of the senate. Ten years after stepping down from the state senate, DeKoster served on the Iowa Senate Ethics Committee.

DeKoster married Dorothea LaVonne Hymans in 1942, with whom he raised five children. He died in Hull on February 23, 2000, aged 81.

References

External links
Guide to the Lucas James DeKoster Papers, held at the University of Iowa Libraries

1918 births
Kansas State University alumni
Iowa State University alumni
2000 deaths
Republican Party Iowa state senators
20th-century American politicians
People from Hull, Iowa
20th-century American engineers
Engineers from Iowa
Iowa lawyers
20th-century American lawyers
Cleveland–Marshall College of Law alumni